The Book of Judith is a deuterocanonical book, included in the Septuagint and the Catholic and Eastern Orthodox Christian Old Testament of the Bible, but excluded from the Hebrew canon and assigned by Protestants to the apocrypha. It tells of a Jewish widow, Judith, who uses her beauty and charm to destroy an Assyrian general and save Israel from oppression. The surviving Greek manuscripts contain several historical anachronisms, which is why some Protestant scholars now consider the book non-historical: a parable, a theological novel, or perhaps the first historical novel.
The name Judith, meaning "Praised" or "Jewess", is the feminine form of Judah.

Historical context

Original language
It is not clear whether the Book of Judith was originally written in Hebrew or in Greek. The oldest existing version is in the Septuagint, and might either be a translation from Hebrew or composed in Greek. Details of vocabulary and phrasing point to a Greek text written in a language modeled on the Greek developed through translating the other books in the Septuagint.

The extant Hebrew language versions, whether identical to the Greek, or in the shorter Hebrew version, date to the Middle Ages. The Hebrew versions name important figures directly such as the Seleucid king Antiochus IV Epiphanes, thus placing the events in the Hellenistic period when the Maccabees battled the Seleucid monarchs. The Greek version uses deliberately cryptic and anachronistic references such as "Nebuchadnezzar", a "King of Assyria", who "reigns in Nineveh", for the same king. The adoption of that name, though unhistorical, has been sometimes explained either as a copyist's addition, or an arbitrary name assigned to the ruler of Babylon.

Canonicity

In Judaism
Although the author was likely Jewish, there is no evidence that the Book of Judith was ever considered authoritative or a candidate for canonicity by any Jewish group.

The Masoretic Text of the Hebrew Bible does not contain it, nor was it found among the Dead Sea Scrolls or referred to in any early Rabbinic literature.

Reasons for its exclusion include the lateness of its composition, possible Greek origin, open support of the Hasmonean dynasty (to which the early rabbinate was opposed), and perhaps the brash and seductive character of Judith herself.

However, after disappearing from circulation among Jews for over a millennium, references to the Book of Judith, and the figure of Judith herself, resurfaced in the religious literature of crypto-Jews who escaped Christian persecution after the capitulation of the Caliphate of Córdoba. The renewed interest took the form of "tales of the heroine, liturgical poems, commentaries on the Talmud, and passages in Jewish legal codes."

Although the text itself does not mention Hanukkah, it became customary for a Hebrew midrashic variant of the Judith story to be read on the Shabbat of Hanukkah as the story of Hanukkah takes place during the time of the Hasmonean dynasty.

That midrash, whose heroine is portrayed as gorging the enemy on cheese and wine before cutting off his head, may have formed the basis of the minor Jewish tradition to eat dairy products during Hanukkah.

In that respect, Medieval Jewry appears to have viewed Judith as the Hasmonean counterpart to Queen Esther, the heroine of the holiday of Purim. The textual reliability of the Book of Judith was also taken for granted, to the extent that Biblical commentator Nachmanides (Ramban) quoted several passages from a Peshitta (Syriac version) of Judith in support of his rendering of Deuteronomy 21:14.

In Christianity
Although early Christians, such as Clement of Rome, Tertullian, and Clement of Alexandria, read and used the Book of Judith, some of the oldest Christian canons, including the Bryennios List (1st/2nd century), that of Melito of Sardis (2nd century) and Origen (3rd century), do not include it. Jerome, when he produced his Latin translation, the Vulgate, counted it among the apocrypha, (although he changed his mind and later quoted it as scripture, and said he merely expressed the views of the Jews), as did Athanasius, Cyril of Jerusalem and Epiphanius of Salamis.

However, some influential fathers of the Church, including Augustine, Ambrose, and Hilary of Poitiers, considered Judith sacred scripture, and Pope Innocent I declared it part of the canon. In Jerome's Prologue to Judith he claims that the Book of Judith was "found by the Nicene Council to have been counted among the number of the Sacred Scriptures". However, no such declaration has been found in the Canons of Nicaea, and it is uncertain whether Jerome is referring to the use made of the book in the discussions of the council, or whether he was misled by some spurious canons attributed to that council.

It was also accepted by the councils of Rome (382), Hippo (393), Carthage (397), Florence (1442) and eventually dogmatically defined as canonical by the Roman Catholic Church in 1546 in the Council of Trent. The Eastern Orthodox Church also accepts Judith as inspired scripture, as was confirmed in the Synod of Jerusalem in 1672.

The canonicity of Judith is typically rejected by Protestants, who accept as the Old Testament only those books that are found in the Jewish canon. Martin Luther viewed the book as an allegory, but listed it as the first of the eight writings in his Apocrypha. In Anglicanism, it has the intermediate authority of the Apocrypha of the OT, regarded as useful or edifying but not to be taken as a basis for establishing doctrine.

Judith is also referred to in chapter 28 of 1 Meqabyan, a book considered canonical in the Ethiopian Orthodox Tewahedo Church.

Contents

Plot summary
The story revolves around Judith, a daring and beautiful widow, who is upset with her Jewish countrymen for not trusting God to deliver them from their foreign conquerors. She goes with her loyal maid to the camp of the enemy general, Holofernes, with whom she slowly ingratiates herself, promising him information on the Israelites. Gaining his trust, she is allowed access to his tent one night as he lies in a drunken stupor. She decapitates him, then takes his head back to her fearful countrymen. The Assyrians, having lost their leader, disperse, and Israel is saved. Though she is courted by many, Judith remains unmarried for the rest of her life.

Literary structure
The Book of Judith can be split into two parts or "acts" of approximately equal length. Chapters 1–7 describe the rise of the threat to Israel, led by the evil king Nebuchadnezzar and his sycophantic general Holofernes, and is concluded as Holofernes' worldwide campaign has converged at the mountain pass where Judith's village, Bethulia, is located. Chapters 8–16 then introduce Judith and depict her heroic actions to save her people. The first part, although at times tedious  in its description of the military developments, develops important themes by alternating battles with reflections and rousing action with rest. In contrast, the second half is devoted mainly to Judith's strength of character and the beheading scene.

The New Oxford Annotated Apocrypha identifies a clear chiastic pattern in both "acts", in which the order of events is reversed at a central moment in the narrative (i.e., abcc'b'a').

Part I (1:1–7:23)

A. Campaign against disobedient nations; the people surrender (1:1–2:13)

B. Israel is "greatly terrified" (2:14–3:10)

C. Joakim prepares for war (4:1–15)

D. Holofernes talks with Achior (5:1–6.9)

E. Achior is expelled by Assyrians (6:10–13)

E'. Achior is received in the village of Bethulia (6:14–15)

D'. Achior talks with the people (6:16–21)

C'. Holofernes prepares for war (7:1–3)

B'. Israel is "greatly terrified" (7:4–5)

A'. Campaign against Bethulia; the people want to surrender (7:6–32)

Part II (8:1–16:25)

A. Introduction of Judith (8:1–8)

B. Judith plans to save Israel (8:9–10:8), including her extended prayer (9:1-14)

C. Judith and her maid leave Bethulia (10:9–10)

D. Judith beheads Holofernes (10:11–13:10a)

C'. Judith and her maid return to Bethulia (13.10b–11)

B'. Judith plans the destruction of Israel's enemy (13:12–16:20)

A'. Conclusion about Judith (16.1–25)

Similarly, parallels within Part II are noted in comments within the New American Bible Revised Edition: Judith summons a town meeting in Judith 8:10 in advance of her expedition and is acclaimed by such a meeting in Judith 13:12-13; Uzziah blesses Judith in advance in Judith 8:5 and afterwards in Judith 13:18-20.

Literary genre
Most contemporary exegetes, such as Biblical scholar Gianfranco Ravasi, generally tend to ascribe Judith to one of several contemporaneous literary genres, reading it as an extended parable in the form of a historical fiction, or a propaganda literary work from the days of the Seleucid oppression.

It has also been called "an example of the ancient Jewish novel in the Greco-Roman period". Other scholars note that Judith fits within and even incorporates the genre of "salvation traditions" from the Old Testament, particularly the story of Deborah and Jael (Judges 4–5), who seduced and inebriated the Canaanite commander Sisera before hammering a tent-peg into his forehead.

There are also thematic connections to the revenge of Simeon and Levi on Shechem after the rape of Dinah in Genesis 34.

In the Christian West from the patristic period on, Judith was invoked in a wide variety of texts as a multi-faceted allegorical figure. As a "Mulier sancta", she personified the Church and many virtues – Humility, Justice, Fortitude, Chastity (the opposite of Holofernes' vices Pride, Tyranny, Decadence, Lust) – and she was, like the other heroic women of the Hebrew scriptural tradition, made into a typological prefiguration of the Virgin Mary. Her gender made her a natural example of the biblical paradox of "strength in weakness"; she is thus paired with David and her beheading of Holofernes paralleled with that of Goliath – both deeds saved the Covenant People from a militarily superior enemy.

Main characters
Judith, the heroine of the book, introduced in chapter 8. A God-fearing woman, she is the daughter of Merari, a Simeonite, and widow of a certain Manasseh or Manasses, a wealthy farmer. She sends her maid or "waitingwoman"  to Uzziah to challenge his decision to capitulate to the Assyrians if God has not rescued the people of Bethulia within five days, and she uses her charm to become an intimate friend of Holofernes, but beheads him allowing Israel to counter-attack the Assyrians. Judith's maid, not named in the story, remains with her throughout the narrative and is given her freedom as the story ends.

Holofernes, the villain of the book. He is a dedicated soldier of his king, general-in-chief of his army, whom he wants to see exalted in all lands. He is given the task of destroying the rebels who did not support the king of Nineveh in his resistance against Cheleud and the king of Media, until Israel also becomes a target of his military campaign. Judith's courage and charm occasion his death.

Nebuchadnezzar, claimed here to be the king of Nineveh and Assyria. He is so proud that he wants to affirm his strength as a sort of divine power, although Holofernes, his Turtan (commanding general), goes beyond the king's orders when he calls on the western nations to "worship only Nebuchadnezzar, and ... invoke him as a god". Holofernes is ordered to take revenge on those who refused to ally themselves with Nebuchadnezzar.

Achior, an Ammonite leader at Nebuchadnezzar's court; in chapter 5 he summarises the history of Israel and warns the king of Assyria of the power of their God, the "God of heaven", but is mocked. He is protected by the people of Bethulia and becomes a Jew and is circumcised on hearing what Judith has accomplished.

Bagoas, or Vagao (Vulgate), the eunuch who had charge over Holofernes' personal affairs. His name is Persian for a eunuch. He brought in Judith to recline with Holofernes and was the first one who discovered his beheading.

Uzziah or Oziah, governor of Bethulia; together with Cabri and Carmi, he rules over Judith's city. When the city is besieged by the Assyrians and the water supply dries up, he agrees to the people's call to surrender if God has not rescued them within five days, a decision challenged as "rash" by Judith.

Judith's prayer
Chapter 9 constitutes Judith's "extended prayer", "loudly proclaimed" in advance of her actions in the following chapters. This runs to 14 verses in English versions, 19 verses in the Vulgate.

Historicity of Judith

It is generally accepted that the Book of Judith is ahistorical. The fictional nature "is evident from its blending of history and fiction, beginning in the very first verse, and is too prevalent thereafter to be considered as the result of mere historical mistakes."

Thus, the great villain is "Nebuchadnezzar, who ruled over the Assyrians" (1:1), yet the historical Nebuchadnezzar II was the king of Babylonia. Other details, such as fictional place names, the immense size of armies and fortifications, and the dating of events, cannot be reconciled with the historical record. Judith's village, Bethulia (literally "virginity") is unknown and otherwise unattested to in any ancient writing.

Nevertheless, there have been various attempts by both scholars and clergy to understand the characters and events in the Book as allegorical representations of actual personages and historical events. Much of this work has focused on linking Nebuchadnezzar with various conquerors of Judea from different time periods and, more recently, linking Judith herself with historical female leaders, including Queen Salome Alexandra, Judea's only female monarch (76–67 BC) and its last ruler to die while Judea remained an independent kingdom.

Identification of Nebuchadnezzar with Artaxerxes III Ochus
The identity of Nebuchadnezzar was unknown to the Church Fathers, but some of them attempted an improbable identification with Artaxerxes III Ochus (425–338 BC), not on the basis of the character of the two rulers, but due to the presence of a "Holofernes" and a "Bagoas" in Ochus' army. This view also gained currency with scholarship in the late 19th and early 20th centuries.

Identification of Nebuchadnezzar with Ashurbanipal
In his comparison between the Book of Judith and Assyrian history, Catholic priest and scholar Fulcran Vigouroux (1837–1915) attempts an identification of Nabuchodonosor king of Assyria with Ashurbanipal (668–627 BC) and his rival Arphaxad king of the Medes with Phraortes (665–653 BC), the son of Deioces, founder of Ecbatana.

As argued by Vigouroux, the two battles mentioned in the Septuagint version of the Book of Judith are a reference to the clash of the two empires in 658–657 and to Phraortes' death in battle in 653, after which Ashurbanipal continued his military actions with a large campaign starting with the Battle of the Ulaya River (652 BC) on the 18th year of this Assyrian king. Contemporary sources make reference to the many allies of Chaldea (governed by Ashurbanipal's rebel brother Shamash-shum-ukin), including the Kingdom of Israel and the Kingdom of Judah, which were subjects of Assyria and are mentioned in the Book of Judith as victims of Ashurbanipal's Western campaign.

During that period, as in the Book of Judith, there was no king in Judah since the legitimate sovereign, Manasseh of Judah, was being held captive in Nineveh at this time. As a typical policy of the time, all leadership was thus transferred in the hands of the High Priest of Israel in charge, which was Joakim in this case (Judith 4:6). The profanation of the temple (Judith 4:3) might have been that under king Hezekiah (see 2 Chronicles, xxix, 18–19), who reigned between c. 715 and 686 BC.

Although Nebuchadnezzar and Ashurbanipal's campaigns show direct parallels, the main incident of Judith's intervention has never been recorded in official history. Additionally, the reasons for the name changes are difficult to understand, unless the text was transmitted without character names before they were added by the Greek translator, who lived centuries later. Moreover, Ashurbanipal is never referenced by name in the Bible, except perhaps for the corrupt form "Asenappar" in 2 Chronicles and Ezra 4:10 or the anonymous title "The King of Assyria" in the 2 Kings, which means his name might have never been recorded by Jewish historians.

Identification of Nebuchadnezzar with Tigranes the Great
Modern scholars argue in favor of a 2nd–1st century context for the Book of Judith, understanding it as a sort of roman à clef, i.e. a literary fiction whose characters stand for some real historical figure, generally contemporary to the author. In the case of the Book of Judith, Biblical scholar Gabriele Boccaccini, identified Nebuchadnezzar with Tigranes the Great (140–56 BC), a powerful King of Armenia who, according to Josephus and Strabo, conquered all of the lands identified by the Biblical author in Judith.

Under this theory, the story, although fictional, would be set in the time of Queen Salome Alexandra, the only Jewish regnant queen, who reigned over Judea from 76 to 67 BC.

Like Judith, the Queen had to face the menace of a foreign king who had a tendency to destroy the temples of other religions. Both women were widows whose strategical and diplomatic skills helped in the defeat of the invader. Both stories seem to be set at a time when the temple had recently been rededicated, which is the case after Judas Maccabee killed Nicanor and defeated the Seleucids. The territory of Judean occupation includes the territory of Samaria, something which was possible in Maccabean times only after John Hyrcanus reconquered those territories. Thus, the presumed Sadducee author of Judith would desire to honor the great (Pharisee) Queen who tried to keep both Sadducees and Pharisees united against the common menace.

Place names specific to the Book of Judith
Whilst a number of the places referred to are familiar biblical or modern place names, there are others which are considered fictional or whose location is not otherwise known. These include:
1:5 - the territory of Ragae, possible Rages or Rhages, cf. Tobit 1:16 
1:6 - the rivers Euphrates and Tigris are mentioned, as well as the Hydaspes (Jadason in the Vulgate). Hydaspes is also the Greek name for the Jhelum River in modern India and Pakistan
2:21 - the plain of Bectileth, three days' march from Nineveh
4:4 - Kona
4:4 - Belmain
4:4 - Choba
4:4 - Aesora. The Septuagint calls it Aisora, Arasousia, Aisoraa, or Assaron, depending on the manuscript.
4:4 - The valley of Salem
4:6 and several later references - Bethulia, a gated city (Judith 10:6). From the gates of the city, the valley below can be observed (Judith 10:10)
4:6 - Betomesthaim or Betomasthem. Some translations refer to "the people of Bethulia and Betomesthaim" as a unit, which "faces (singular) Esdraelon opposite the plain near Dothan. The Encyclopaedia Britannica refers to the "Plain of Esdraelon" as the plain between the Galilee hills and Samaria.
4:6 - A plain near Dothan (Dothian in the Vulgate)
7:3 - Cyalon or Cynamon, also facing Esdraelon. The Encyclopedia of the Bible notes that "some scholars have felt that this name is a corruption for Jokneam", but its editors argue that there is "little evidence to support this conjecture".
7:18 - Egrebeh, which is near Chubi, beside the Wadi Mochmur.
8:4 - Balamon. Some versions state that Manasseh, Judith's husband, had been buried in a field between Dothan and Balamon (Jerusalem Bible, New Revised Standard Version); others state that he was buried in Bethulia where he had died (Vulgate, Douay-Rheims 1899 American Edition).
15:4 - Along with Betomesthaim, some authorities also mention Bebai.

Later artistic renditions
The character of Judith is larger than life, and she has won a place in Jewish and Christian lore, art, poetry and drama. Her name, which means "she will be praised" or "woman of Judea", suggests that she represents the heroic spirit of the Jewish people, and that same spirit, as well as her chastity, have endeared her to Christianity.

Owing to her unwavering religious devotion, she is able to step outside of her widow's role, and dress and act in a sexually provocative manner while clearly remaining true to her ideals in the reader's mind, and her seduction and beheading of the wicked Holofernes while playing this role has been rich fodder for artists of various genres.

In literature

The first extant commentary on The Book of Judith is by Hrabanus Maurus (9th century). Thenceforth her presence in medieval European literature is robust: in homilies, biblical paraphrases, histories and poetry. An Old English poetic version is found together with Beowulf (their epics appear both in the Nowell Codex). "The opening of the poem is lost (scholars estimate that 100 lines were lost) but the remainder of the poem, as can be seen, the poet reshaped the biblical source and set the poem's narrative to an Anglo-Saxon audience."

At the same time she is the subject of a homily by the Anglo-Saxon abbot Ælfric. The two conceptual poles represented by these works will inform much of Judith's subsequent history.

In the epic, she is the brave warrior, forceful and active; in the homily she is an exemplar of pious chastity for cloistered nuns. In both cases, her narrative gained relevance from the Viking invasions of the period. Within the next three centuries Judith would be treated by such major figures as Heinrich Frauenlob, Dante, and Geoffrey Chaucer.

In medieval Christian art, the predominance of church patronage assured that Judith's patristic valences as "Mulier Sancta" and Virgin Mary prototype would prevail: from the 8th-century frescoes in Santa Maria Antigua in Rome through innumerable later bible miniatures. Gothic cathedrals often featured Judith, most impressively in the series of 40 stained glass panels at the Sainte-Chapelle in Paris (1240s).

In Renaissance literature and visual arts, all of these trends were continued, often in updated forms, and developed. The already well established notion of Judith as an exemplum of the courage of local people against tyrannical rule from afar was given new urgency by the Assyrian nationality of Holofernes, which made him an inevitable symbol of the threatening Turks. The Italian Renaissance poet Lucrezia Tornabuoni chose Judith as one of the five subjects of her poetry on biblical figures.

A similar dynamic was created in the 16th century by the confessional strife of the Reformation and Counter-Reformation. Both Protestants and Catholics draped themselves in the protective mantle of Judith and cast their "heretical" enemies as Holofernes.

In 16th-century France, writers such as Guillaume Du Bartas, Gabrielle de Coignard and Anne de Marquets composed poems on Judith's triumph over Holofernes. Croatian poet and humanist Marko Marulić also wrote an epic on Judith's story in 1501, the Judita. Italian poet and scholar Bartolomeo Tortoletti wrote a Latin epic on the Biblical character of Judith (Bartholomaei Tortoletti Iuditha uindex e uindicata, 1628). The Catholic tract A Treatise of Schisme, written in 1578 at Douai by the English Roman Catholic scholar Gregory Martin, included a paragraph in which Martin expressed confidence that "the Catholic Hope would triumph, and pious Judith would slay Holofernes". This was interpreted by the English Protestant authorities at the time as incitement to slay Queen Elizabeth I. It served as the grounds for the death sentence passed on printer William Carter who had printed Martin's tract and who was executed in 1584.

In painting and sculpture

The subject is one of the most commonly shown in the Power of Women topos. The account of Judith's beheading of Holofernes has been treated by several painters and sculptors, most notably Donatello and Caravaggio, as well as Sandro Botticelli, Andrea Mantegna, Giorgione, Lucas Cranach the Elder, Titian, Horace Vernet, Gustav Klimt, Artemisia Gentileschi, Jan Sanders van Hemessen, Trophime Bigot, Francisco Goya, Francesco Cairo and Hermann-Paul. Also, Michelangelo depicts the scene in multiple aspects in one of the Pendentives, or four spandrels on the ceiling of the Sistine Chapel. Judy Chicago included Judith with a place setting in The Dinner Party.

In music and theatre
The famous 40-voice motet Spem in alium by English composer Thomas Tallis, is a setting of a text from the Book of Judith. The story also inspired oratorios by Antonio Vivaldi, W. A. Mozart and Hubert Parry, and an operetta by Jacob Pavlovitch Adler. Marc-Antoine Charpentier has composed, Judith sive Bethulia liberata H.391, oratorio for soloists, chorus, 2 flutes, strings, and continuo (? mid-1670s). Elisabeth Jacquet de La Guerre (EJG.30) and Sébastien de Brossard have composed a cantate Judith.

Alessandro Scarlatti wrote an oratorio in 1693, La Giuditta, as did the Portuguese composer Francisco António de Almeida in 1726; Juditha triumphans was written in 1716 by Antonio Vivaldi; Mozart composed in 1771 La Betulia Liberata (KV 118), to a libretto by Pietro Metastasio. Arthur Honegger composed an oratorio, Judith, in 1925 to a libretto by René Morax. Operatic treatments exist by Russian composer Alexander Serov, Judith, by Austrian composer Emil von Reznicek, Holofernes, and Judith by German composer Siegfried Matthus. The French composer Jean Guillou wrote his Judith-Symphonie for Mezzo and Orchestra in 1970, premiered in Paris in 1972 and published by Schott-Music.

In 1840, Friedrich Hebbel's play Judith was performed in Berlin. He deliberately departs from the biblical text:

I have no use for the biblical Judith. There, Judith is a widow who lures Holofernes into her web with wiles, when she has his head in her bag she sings and jubilates with all of Israel for three months. That is mean, such a nature is not worthy of her success [...]. My Judith is paralyzed by her deed, frozen by the thought that she might give birth to Holofernes' son; she knows that she has passed her boundaries, that she has, at the very least, done the right thing for the wrong reasons.

The story of Judith has been a favourite of latter-day playwrights; it was brought alive in 1892 by Abraham Goldfaden, who worked in Eastern Europe. The American playwright Thomas Bailey Aldrich's Judith of Bethulia was first performed in New York, 1905, and was the basis for the 1914 production Judith of Bethulia by director D. W. Griffith. A full hour in length, it was one of the earliest feature films made in the United States. English writer Arnold Bennett in 1919 tried his hand at dramaturgy with Judith, a faithful reproduction in three acts; it premiered in spring 1919 at Devonshire Park Theatre, Eastbourne. In 1981, the play "Judith among the Lepers" by the Israeli (Hebrew) playwright Moshe Shamir was performed in Israel. Shamir examines the question why the story of Judith was excluded from the Jewish (Hebrew) Bible and thus banned from Jewish history. In putting her story on stage he tries to reintegrate Judith's story into Jewish history. English playwright Howard Barker examined the Judith story and its aftermath, first in the scene "The Unforeseen Consequences of a Patriotic Act", as part of his collection of vignettes, The Possibilities. Barker later expanded the scene into a short play Judith.

Notes

References

Further reading

External links

 The Book of Judith Full text (also available in Arabic)
 Craven, Toni Judith: Apocrypha, The Shalvi/Hyman Encyclopedia of Jewish Women 31 December 1999 at Jewish Women's Archive       
 Toy, Crawford Howell; Torrey, Charles C. JUDITH, BOOK OF at The Jewish Encyclopedia, 1906
 
  

Book of Judith
Deuterocanonical books
Ancient Hebrew texts
Historical novels
Jewish apocrypha
Biblical women in ancient warfare
Historical books